Crust was a musical group from Austin, Texas that was active during the late-1980s and 1990s and was featured on Trance Syndicate Records, a record label run by King Coffey from the Butthole Surfers. The group's members were John Hawkins (vocals and misc.), Jerry Page (bass and misc.), and Richard Smith (percussion and misc.).

History 

John Hawkins, Jerry Page, and Richard Smith formed the group in 1987. Shortly after its formation, the trio (as "Mud Honey") organized and released a compilation cassette, The Polyp Explodes. Along with Crust, the cassette featured the Austin bands Miracle Room, Ed Hall, ST37, Seemen, and Thanatopsis Throne. The band's early instrumentation included tape loops, feedback devices, spring reverberators, and drum machines, but later incorporated traditional rock instruments such as drum kit, electric guitar, bass and keyboard.

The band embarked on a concert tour of the West Coast in December 1989. Crust achieved some notoriety for their stage antics, which frequently included live earthworms, fresh beef tongues, nudity, and fire.

On Good Friday, 1990, Trance Syndicate released Crust's first EP, Sacred Heart of Crust; it was the first release from the record label. The trio toured the East Coast of the United States and Canada; songs such as "Head Lice" emerged from the group's travel experiences. Trance Syndicate released the band's first full-length album, Crust in 1991, followed by a second album, Crusty Love in 1994. The band continued to tour, but scaled back its live performances following a series of mishaps (including one in which John Hawkins was stabbed), finally disbanding after an appearance at the 1997 SXSW festival.  The band performed a reunion show to a sold-out crowd at Room 710 on May 22, 2004 in Austin.

Discography
 1990: Crust
 1991: Sacred Heart of Crust(EP)
 1994: Crusty Love
 1999: Food Eater (Self-Released)

References

External links
 
 Crust at Trouser Press

Musical groups from Austin, Texas
American experimental musical groups
Trance Syndicate artists
Musical groups established in 1987
1987 establishments in Texas